This list of the Paleozoic life of Michigan contains the various prehistoric life-forms whose fossilized remains have been reported from within the US state of Michigan and are between 538.8 and 252.17 million years of age.

A

 †Acanthoclema
 †Acanthoclema ohioensis
 †Acanthonema – type locality for genus
 †Acanthonema holopiforme – type locality for species
 †Acanthonema laxa – type locality for species
 †Acidaspis
 †Actinoceras
 †Actinoceras backi
 †Actinoceras bigsbyi – or unidentified comparable form
 †Actinoceras gouldense – type locality for species
 †Actinoceras sphaeroidale
 †Alaskozygopleura
 †Alaskozygopleura gracillium
   †Alethopteris
 †Alethopteris decurrens
 †Alethopteris Helenae
 †Allonema
 †Ambocoelia – report made of unidentified related form or using admittedly obsolete nomenclature
 †Ambocoelia umbonata – report made of unidentified related form or using admittedly obsolete nomenclature
 †Ambonychia
 †Ambonychia carinata
 †Ambonychia elroyi
 †Ambonychia obesa
 †Amphilichas
 †Amphilichas cucullus – tentative report
 †Anazyga
 †Anazyga recurvirostra
   †Annularia
 †Annularia asteris
 †Annularia sphenophylloides
 †Anomalodonta
 †Anomalodonta gigantea – or unidentified comparable form
 †Anoptera
 †Anoptera angusta
 †Anthropora
 †Anthropora shafferi
 †Antirotella
 †Antirotella helicinaeformis – type locality for species
 †Archinacella
 †Archinacella kagawongensis
 †Arcyzona
 †Arcyzona apobathrota
 †Arthroacantha
 †Arthroacantha carpenteri
 †Ascodictyon
 †Ascodictyon fusiforme
 †Asolanus
 †Asolanus camptotaena
 †Asterophyllites
 †Asterophyllites equisetiformis
 †Asterophyllites longifolius – or unidentified comparable form
 †Asterophyllites vernensis
 †Atactoechus
 †Atactoechus typicus – or unidentified comparable form
 †Athyris
 †Athyris lens
 †Athyris vittata
  †Atrypa
 †Atrypa traversensis
 †Aulacera
 †Aulacera nodulifera
 †Aulacotheca
 †Aulacotheca Campbelli
 †Aulocystis
 †Aulocystis auloporoidea
 †Aulocystis jacksoni
 †Aulocystis lucasensis
  †Aulopora
 †Aulopora microbuccinata

B

 †Batostoma
 †Beatricea
 †Beatricea undulata
  †Bellerophon
 †Bellerophon barquensis – type locality for species
 †Bellerophon newberryi
 †Bellerophon pelops
 †Bensbergia
 †Bensbergia subcostata
 †Bethanyphyllum
 †Bethanyphyllum robustum
 †Bicarina
 †Bicarina petilitornata
 †Bigalea – type locality for genus
 †Bigalea yangi – type locality for species
 †Billingsites
 †Billingsites newberryi
 †Bothrodendron
 †Bothrodendron minutifolium
 †Bothrodendron punctatum
 †Botryllopora
 †Botryllopora socialis
 †Bowmanites
 †Brachyprion
 †Buechelia
 †Buechelia tyrrelli
 †Byssonychia
 †Byssonychia richmondensis
 Bythocypris
 †Bythocypris cylindrica
 †Bythopora
 †Bythopora striata

C

   †Calamites
 †Calamites carinatus
 †Calamites cistii
 †Calamites ramosus
 †Calamites schutzeiformis
 †Calamites suckowii
 †Calamites undulatus
 †Calapoecia
 †Calapoecia cribriformis
 †Calapoecia huronensis
 †Callipleura
 †Callipleura nobilis – or unidentified comparable form
 †Callixylon
 †Callixylon newberryi
  †Calymene
 †Camarotoechia
 †Cardiocaron
 †Cardiocaron reniformis
 †Cardiocarpon
 †Cardiocarpon annulatum
 †Cardiocarpon bicuspidatum
 †Cardiocarpon cuyahogae
 †Cardiocarpon late-alatum
 †Cardiocarpon ovale
  †Ceraurus
 †Ceraurus simmonsi
 †Cerithioides
 †Cerithioides incomptum
 †Cheirocrinus – tentative report
 †Chonetes
 †Chonetes ensicosta
 †Chonetes hybus
 †Chonetes pachyactis
 †Clathronema
 †Clathronema cingulata
 †Clidophorus
 †Clidophorus noquettensis
 †Clidophorus ogontzensis
  †Climacograptus
 †Climacograptus putillus
 †Coelospira
 †Coleolus
 †Colpomya
 †Colpomya colgateri
 †Columnaria
 †Columnaria alveolata
 †Columnaria calicina
 †Columnaria stokesi
 †Conularia
 †Conularia formosa
 †Conularia trentonensis
 †Cordaianthus
 †Cordaianthus ampullaceus
 †Cordaianthus devonicus
  †Cordaites
 †Cordaites borassifolius
 †Cordaites crassinervis
 †Cordaites michiganensis
 †Cordaites palmaeformis
 †Cordaites principalis
 †Cordaites Robbii – tentative report
  †Cornulites
 †Cornulites corrugatus
 †Cornulites flexuosus
 †Cornulites sterlingensis – or unidentified comparable form
 †Corocrinus
 †Corocrinus pettyesi
 †Corynepteris
 †Corynepteris coralloides – tentative report
 †Cranaena
 †Cranaena amygdaloidea – or unidentified related form
 †Cranaena lincklaeni
 †Cranaena romingeri
 †Crenulazona
 †Crenulazona angulata
 †Cryptonella
 †Ctenodonta
 †Ctenodonta iphigenia
 †Cuneamya
 †Cuneamya miamiensis
 †Cupularostrum
 †Cupularostrum prolificum
 †Cyclonema
 †Cyclonema minuta
 †Cylindrophyllum
 †Cylindrophyllum profundum
 †Cymatonota
 †Cymatonota typicalis – or unidentified comparable form
 †Cyrtina
 †Cyrtina alpenensis
 †Cyrtina hamiltonensis – report made of unidentified related form or using admittedly obsolete nomenclature
 †Cyrtina umbonata
 †Cyrtoceras – tentative report
 †Cyrtodonta
 †Cyrtodonta grandis
 †Cyrtodonta potteri
 †Cyrtolites
 †Cyrtolites ornatus
 †Cyrtostropha
 †Cyrtostropha salteri

D

 †Dalmanella
 †Dalmanella emacerata
 †Dalmanella jugosa
 †Decorochilina
 †Decorochilina robusta
 †Denayella
 †Denayella bella – type locality for species
 †Devonalosia
 †Devonalosia wrightorum
 †Devonochonetes
 †Devonochonetes coronatus
 †Devonochonetes fragilis
 †Devonochonetes scitulus
 †Dictyobembix – type locality for genus
 †Dictyobembix bella – type locality for species
 †Diplothmema
 †Discinites
 †Discinites delectus
 †Discinites jongmansi
 †Discosorus
 †Discosorus ehlersi – type locality for species
 †Discosorus halli – type locality for species
 †Discosorus parksi – type locality for species
 †Discosorus remotus – tentative report
 †Douvillina
 †Douvillina distans
 †Duncanella – tentative report

E

 †Echinocaris
 †Echinocaris punctata
 †Echinocoelia
 †Elasmonema – tentative report
 †Elasmonema corrugata
 †Eldredgeops
 †Eldredgeops rana
 †Eliasopora
 †Eliasopora stellatum
 †Elita
 †Elita filicosta
  †Encrinurus
  †Endoceras
 †Eremopteris
 †Eremopteris michiganensis
  †Erieopterus
 †Erieopterus microphthalmus
 †Euphemites – tentative report
 †Euphemites devoniana
 †Euryzone
 †Euryzone latitornata – type locality for species
 †Euryzone pharkidopyndax – type locality for species
 †Euthyrhachis
 †Euthyrhachis indianense

F

  †Favosites
 †Ferganella
 †Flexicalymene
 †Flexicalymene croneisi
 †Flexicalymene magnipapilla – type locality for species
 †Flexicalymene meeki – or unidentified comparable form
 †Flexicalymene planilabra – type locality for species
 †Flexicalymene praelongicephala – type locality for species
 †Flexicalymene quadricapita – type locality for species
 †Flexicalymene senaria
 †Floweria
 †Floweria lirella

G

 †Geniculograptus
 †Geniculograptus pygmaeus
 †Gennaeocrinus
 †Gennaeocrinus chilmanae
 †Gennaeocrinus romingeri
 †Genuspira – type locality for genus
 †Genuspira nodosa – type locality for species
 †Gigantopteris
 †Gigantopteris dawsoni
 †Gigantopteris kellyi
  †Gilbertsocrinus
 †Gilbertsocrinus ohioensis
 †Ginkgophyllum
 †Ginkgophyllum grandifolium
 †Girvanella
 †Girvanella richmondensis
 †Glossograptus
 †Grammysia
 †Graptodictya
 †Graptodictya proava
  †Grewingkia
 †Grewingkia canadensis
 †Grewingkia deltensis
 †Gypidula
 †Gypidula petoskeyensis

H

   †Hallopora
 †Hallopora subnodosa
   †Halysites
 †Halysites gracilis
 †Hebertella
 †Hebertella alveata
 †Hebertella occidentalis
 †Hederella
 †Hederella alpenensis
 †Hederella bilineata
 †Hederella cirrhosa
 †Hederella concinnoides
 †Hederella delicatula
 †Hederella filiformis
 †Hederella magna
 †Hederella parvirugosa
 †Hederella rectifurcata
 †Hederella reimanni
 †Hederella stolonifera
 †Hederella thedfordensis
 †Hederella vagans
 †Helicelasma
 †Helicelasma rusticum
 †Helicotoma
 †Helicotoma brocki
 †Helopora
 †Helopora inexpectata
 †Hercostrophia
 †Hercostrophia robusta
 †Hesperorthis
 †Hesperorthis tricenaria
 †Heterophrentis
 †Heterophrentis simplex
 †Heterotrypa
  †Hexagonaria
 †Hexagonaria pericarinata
 †Hindia
 †Hindia subrotunda
 †Hippocardia
 †Hippocardia monroica
 †Hippurograptus
 †Hiscobeccus
 †Hiscobeccus capax
  †Holopea
 †Holopea hubbardi – or unidentified related form
 †Holtedahlina
 †Holtedahlina sulcata
 †Hormotoma
 †Hormotoma gracilis
 †Hormotomina
 †Hormotomina penduliobesa
 †Howellella
 †Huronia
 †Huronia annulata
 †Huronia bigsbyi
 †Huronia bigsbyi intermedia – type locality for variety
 †Huronia distincta
 †Huronia engadinensis – type locality for species
 †Huronia minuens
 †Huronia obliqua
 †Huronia paulodilatata
 †Huronia romingeri
 †Huronia turbinata
 †Huronia minuens
 †Huronia vertebralis
 †Huroniella
 †Huroniella ehlersi – type locality for species
 †Hyperoblastus
 †Hyperoblastus reimanni
 †Hypomphalocirrus
 †Hypomphalocirrus rugosus

I

 †Icriodus
 †Icriodus latericrescens
 †Illionia
 †Inocaulis
 †Intrapora
 †Isochilina
  †Isotelus
 †Isotelus gigas

K

 †Kitikamispira
 †Kitikamispira speciosum

L

 †Leioclema
 †Leioclema alpenense
 †Leiorhynchus
 †Leiorhynchus kelloggi
 †Leiorhynchus lucasi
 †Leperditia
 †Lepidocarpon
 †Lepidocarpon linear
   †Lepidodendron
 †Lepidodendron aculeatum
 †Lepidodendron Brittsii
 †Lepidodendron dichotomum
 †Lepidodendron lanceolatum
 †Lepidodendron lycopodiodes
 †Lepidodendron obovatum
 †Lepidodendron obvatum
 †Lepidodendron ophiurioides
 †Lepidodendron vestitum
 †Lepidostrobus
 †Lepidostrobus bartlettii
 †Leptaena
 †Leptalosia
 †Leptalosia radicans
 †Leptobolus
 †Leptobolus insignis
 †Leptolosia
 †Leptolosia radicans
 †Leptotrypella
 †Leptotrypella ohioensis
 †Lichenocrinus
 †Lichenocrinus tuberculatus
  †Lingula
 †Lingula changi
 †Lingula cobourgensis
 †Lingula ogontzensis
 †Lingula progne – or unidentified comparable form
 †Lingula whitfieldi – or unidentified comparable form
 †Liospira
 †Liospira micula
 †Longispina
 †Longispina lissohybus
 †Lophospira
 †Lophospira milleri
 †Lophospira perangulata – or unidentified related form
 †Lyopora
 †Lyopora goldfussi

M

 †Maelonoceras
 †Maelonoceras ligarius
 †Manitobiella
 †Manitobiella goniostoma
 †Mariopteris
 †Mariopteris muricata
 †Mariopteris nervosa
 †Mastigograptus
 †Mastigospira
 †Mastigospira ingens – type locality for species
 †Mastigospira intermedia – type locality for species
 †Mediospirifer
 †Mediospirifer audaculus
 †Megastrophia
 †Megastrophia concava
  †Meristella
 †Mesocoelia
 †Mesocoelia obstipisutura
 †Mesocoelia priscum
 †Mesotrypa
 †Modiolopsis
 †Modiolopsis noquettensis
 †Modiolopsis valida
 †Monticulipora
 †Monticulipora epidermata
    †Mucrospirifer
 †Mucrospirifer attenuatus
 †Mucrospirifer grabaui
 †Mucrospirifer latus
 †Mucrospirifer mucronatus
 †Mucrospirifer profundus
 †Mucrospirifer prolificus
 †Mucrospirifer thedfordensis
 †Murchisonia
 †Murchisonia akidota
 †Murchisonia anderdoniae
 †Murchisonia deludisubzona – type locality for species
 †Murchisonia dowlingii
 †Murchisonia gracilicrista
 †Murchisonia sibleyensis
 †Murchisonia subcarinata
 †Murchisonia subulata – type locality for species

N

  †Naticopsis
 †Naticopsis manitobensis
  †Neuropteris
 †Neuropteris caudata
 †Neuropteris dilitata
 †Neuropteris flexuosa
 †Neuropteris gigntea – tentative report
 †Neuropteris harrisi – or unidentified comparable form
 †Neuropteris heterophylla – or unidentified comparable form
 †Neuropteris obliqua
 †Neuropteris rarinervis
 †Neuropteris saginawensis
 †Neuropteris scheuchzeri
 †Neuropteris Schlehani
 †Neuropteris tenuifolia
 †Nodonema
 †Nodonema granulatum
 †Nowakia
 †Nuculites
 †Nuculites neglectus
 †Nuculoidea
 †Nuculoidea lirata – or unidentified comparable form

O

 †Odontopteris
 †Oenonites
 †Oenonites curvidens – or unidentified related form
  †Ogygites
 †Ogygites latimarginatus
 †Oligorachs
 †Oligorachs littletonensis
 †Omphalocirrus
 †Onchometopus
 †Oncoceras
 †Ophisthoptera
 †Ophisthoptera casei – or unidentified comparable form
 †Ophistoloba
 †Ophistoloba gouldi
 †Opisthoptera
 †Opisthoptera gouldi
 †Opisthoptera griffini
 †Opisthopteri
 †Opisthopteri casei – or unidentified comparable form
 †Orbiculoidea
 †Ormoceras
 †Ormoceras bayfieldi
 †Ormoceras whitei
  †Orthoceras
 †Orthoceras alienum – or unidentified comparable form
 †Orthodesma
 †Orthodesma subangulatum – or unidentified comparable form
 †Orthograptus
 †Orthograptus eucharis
 †Orthograptus quadrimucronatus
 †Orthograptus truncatus
 †Orthonota
 †Orthonota parvula
 †Orthonota undulata
 †Orthonychia
 †Orthonychia variablis – type locality for species
 †Orthopleura
 †Orthopleura B Imbrie – informal
 †Oxoplecia – or unidentified comparable form
 †Oxoplecia calhouni

P

 †Pachydictya
 †Pagodea
 †Pagodea falcatinoda – type locality for species
 †Palaeopteridium
 †Palaeopteridium Reussi
 †Palaeoscurria – tentative report
 †Palaeozygopleura
 †Palaeozygopleura hamiltoniae
 †Palaeozygopleura joani
 †Palaeozygopleura sibleyensis
 †Paleofavosites
 †Paleofavosites asper
 †Palmatopteris
 †Palmatopteris furcata
 †Panenka
 †Panenka canadensis
 †Papillicalymene
 †Papillicalymene husseyi – type locality for species
   †Paraspirifer
 †Paraspirifer bownockeri
 †Paupospira
 †Paupospira bowdeni
 †Paupospira tropidophora
  †Pecopteris
 †Pecopteris dentata – tentative report
 †Pecopteris miltoni
 †Penniretepora
 †Penniretepora irregularis – or unidentified comparable form
 †Pentamerella
 †Pentamerella athyroides
 †Pentamerella aulax
 †Pentamerella papilla
 †Pentamerella pericosta
 †Pentamerella petoskeyensis
 †Pentamerella proteus
 †Pentamerella E – informal
 †Pentameroides
  †Pentamerus
 †Peronopora
 †Peronopora decipiens
 †Petrochus
 †Petrochus conica – type locality for species
 †Petrochus mellaria – type locality for species
 †Petrocrania
 †Petrocrania scabiosa
 †Pholadomorpha
 †Pholadomorpha pholadiformis
 †Pholidops
 †Pholidops subtruncata
 †Pholidostrophia
 †Pholidostrophia geniculata
 †Pholidostrophia gracilis
 †Pholidostrophia nacrea
 †Pholidostrophia ovata
 †Phragmolites
 †Phragmolites slawsoni
 †Physostoma
 †Physostoma winchellii
 †Physostoma Winchellii
  †Plaesiomys
 †Plaesiomys subquadrata
 †Planalveolitella
 †Planalveolitella parasitica
   †Platyceras
 †Platyceras bucculentum
 †Platyceras carinatum
 †Platyceras rarispinum
 †Platystrophia
 †Platystrophia acutilirata
 †Platystrophia annieana
 †Platystrophia clarkesvillensis
 †Platystrophia clarksvillensis
 †Platystrophia cypha – or unidentified related form
 †Platystrophia moritura
 †Plectambonites
 †Plectambonites rugosus
 †Plectambonites sericeus
 †Plectonotus
 †Plectonotus raricostatus
  †Pleurodictyum
 †Pleurodictyum cornu
 †Polygnathus
 †Polygnathus varcus
 †Primitia
 †Primitia cincinnatiensis
 †Primitiella
 †Primitiella stoningtonensis
 †Primitiella unicornis
 Proboscina
 †Proboscina auloporoides
 †Productella
  †Proetus
 †Proetus chambliensis
 †Prosserella
 †Prosserella subtransversa
 †Protaraea
 †Protaraea richmondensis
 †Protarea
 †Protarea richmondensis
 †Protokionoceras
 †Protoleptostrophia
 †Protoleptostrophia lirella
 †Protoleptostrophia perplana
 †Pseudoatrypa
 †Pseudoatrypa devoniana – or unidentified comparable form
 †Pseudomphalotrochus
 †Pseudomphalotrochus cottrelli – type locality for species
 †Pseudomphalotrochus gibsoni – type locality for species
 †Pseudopecopteris
 †Pseudopecopteris avoldensis – or unidentified comparable form
 †Psiloconcha
 †Psiloconcha subovalis
 †Pterinea
 †Pterinea demissa
 †Pterinea insueta – or unidentified related form
 †Pterinea insuetta – or unidentified related form
 †Ptychomphalina
 †Ptychomphalina lucina – tentative report
 †Ptychopteria
 †Ptychopteria fasciulatus
 †Ptychopteria michiganesis
 †Ptychopteria swanni
 †Pugnoides

R

 †Rafinesquina
 †Rafinesquina alternata
 †Rafinesquina breviusculus
 †Rafinesquina pregibbosa
 †Rafinesquna
 †Rafinesquna pregibbosa
 †Rectograptus
 †Rectograptus amplexicaulis
 †Rectograptus peosta
 †Retispira
 †Retispira sullivani
 †Rhabdocarpus
 †Rhabdocarpus mammilaris
 †Rhabdocarpus mansfieldi
 †Rhabdocarpus multistriatus
 †Rhinocaris
 †Rhinocaris ehlersi
 †Rhipidomella
 †Rhipidomella penelope – or unidentified comparable form
 †Rhipidomella trigona
 †Rhipidomella vanuxemi
 †Rhipidothyris
 †Rhipidothyris B – informal
 †Rhombotrypa
 †Rhombotrypa quadrata
 †Rhombotrypa subquadrata
 †Rhynchospirina
 †Rhynchotrema
 †Rhynchotrema minnesotensis – or unidentified comparable form
 †Rhynchotrema perlamellosum
 †Rugomena
 †Rugomena vetusta
 †Rutkowskicrinus
 †Rutkowskicrinus collieri – type locality for species
 †Rutkowskicrinus patriciae
 †Rutkowskiella – type locality for genus
 †Rutkowskiella tumula – type locality for species

S

 †Samaropsis
 †Samaropsis Newberryi
 †Samaropsis newberryi
  †Scenella – tentative report
 †Schizophoria
 †Schizophoria ferronensis
 †Schizophoria mesacarina
 †Schizophoria tulliensis
 †Schuchertella
 †Scutellum
 †Semicoscinium
 †Semipora – tentative report
 †Semipora ehlersi
 †Serpulospira
 †Serpulospira diversiformis
  †Sigillaria
 †Sinuites
 †Spermatites
 †Spermatites cylix
 †Spermatites globosus
 †Spermatites reticulatus
 †Sphenophragmus
 †Sphenophragmus nanus
  †Sphenophyllum
 †Sphenophyllum bifurcatum
 †Sphenophyllum cuneifolium
 †Sphenophyllum emarginatum
 †Sphenophyllum majus
 †Sphenophyllum saxifragaefolium
 †Sphenopteris
 †Sphenopters
 †Spinocyrtia
 †Spinocyrtia clintoni
 †Spinocyrtia euryteines – report made of unidentified related form or using admittedly obsolete nomenclature
 †Spinocyrtia granulosa
 †Spinulicosta
 †Spinulicosta mutocosta
 †Spinulicosta spinulicosta
 †Spinyplatyceras
 †Spinyplatyceras bartlettense
  †Spirifer – report made of unidentified related form or using admittedly obsolete nomenclature
 †Spirifer consors
 †Spyroceras
 †Stereotoechus
 †Stereotoechus typicus – or unidentified comparable form
  †Stethacanthus
 †Stethacanthus depressus
 †Stictoporina
 †Stictoporina granulifera
   †Stigmaria
 †Stigmaria verrucosa
 †Stigmatella
 †Stokesoceras
 †Stokesoceras engadinense – type locality for species
 †Stokesoceras gracile
 †Stokesoceras romingeri – type locality for species
 †Straparollus
 †Straparollus mortoni – type locality for species
 †Streblotrypa
 †Streblotrypa anomala
 †Streblotrypa hamiltonensis
 †Streptelasm
 †Streptelasm rusticum
 †Streptelasma
 †Streptelasma divaricans
 †Streptelasma huronensis
 †Striatopora
 †Striatopora linneana
 †Strobeus
 †Strobeus alternatus
 †Stromatocerium
 †Stromatocerium huronense
 †Stropheodonta
 †Stropheodonta demissa – or unidentified comparable form
 †Strophodonta
 †Strophodonta demissa
  †Strophomena
 †Strophomena alpenensis
 †Strophomena costata
 †Strophomena crassa
 †Strophomena elongata
 †Strophomena erratica
 †Strophomena extenuata
 †Strophomena heteromys
 †Strophomena huronensis
 †Strophomena inaequiradiata
 †Strophomena levidensa
 †Strophomena neglecta
 †Strophomena nutans – or unidentified comparable form
 †Strophomena parvula
 †Strophomena pentagonia
 †Strophomena planumbona
 †Strophomena potterensis
 †Strophomena sulcata
 †Strophomena tenuicosta
 †Strophomena titan
 †Styliolina
 †Styliolina fissurella
 †Sulcoretepora
 †Sulcoretepora deissi
 †Sulcoretepora incisurata
 †Sulcoretepora B – informal
  †Syringopora

T

 †Technophorus
 †Technophorus quincuncialis
   †Tentaculites
 †Tentaculites bellulus
 †Tetradella
 †Tetradella regularis
 †Tetradella subquadratus
 †Tetradium
 †Tetradium huronense
 †Thamnopora
 †Thamnopora alpenensis
 †Thamnopora magniventra – type locality for species
 †Thamnoptychia
 †Thamnoptychia labyrinthica
 †Thamnoptychia minuitissima
 †Thamnoptychia silicensis
 †Trematis
 †Trematis rugosa
   †Triarthrus
 †Triarthrus eatoni
 †Trigonacarpolithus
 †Trigonacarpolithus typicus
 †Trigonocarpus – report made of unidentified related form or using admittedly obsolete nomenclature
 †Trigonocarpus Noeggerathi
 †Trigonocarus
 †Trimerella
 †Trochonema
 †Trochonema wartheni
 †Tropidodiscus
 †Tropidodiscus compticarinatus – type locality for species
 †Tropidoleptus
 †Tropidoleptus carinatus
 †Truncalosia
 †Truncalosia gibbosa
 †Turbinilopsis
 †Turbinilopsis anacarina – type locality for species
 †Turbonitella
 †Turbonitella trunculinoda
 †Tylothyris
 †Tylothyris subvaricosa

V

 †Vanuxemia
 †Vanuxemia noquerrwnaia
 †Vanuxemia strattoni
 †Vladanella
 †Vladanella lirata – type locality for species

W

 †Warrenella
 †Warrenella laevis – or unidentified comparable form
 †Whitfieldella
 †Wisconsinella
 †Wisconsinella clelandi – type locality for species

Z

 †Zeilleria
 †Zeilleria stellata
 †Zygospira
 †Zygospira modesta – or unidentified comparable form

References

Uncited entries
 

Paleozoic
Life
Michigan
Michigan-related lists